Rewiring is work done by an electrician.

Rewire, Rewired and variants may also refer to:

Books
Rewired: The Post-Cyberpunk Anthology, collection of stories 2007
Rewire: Digital Cosmopolitans in the Age of Connection, nonfiction book about contemporary globalization 2013
Rewired, poetry collection by Friendly Street Poets 2008

Music
Rewire Festival, an annual international festival for adventurous music, held in The Netherlands
Rewired Tour, by Runrig 2012
Rewired Tour, by The Electric Prunes

Albums
Rewired (album), album by Mike + The Mechanics 
Rewired – The Electric Collection, album by Daryl Stuermer
Rewired, compilation album by Richard Clapton
Rewired, remix album by Raymond Scott 2014
Rewired, album by the Tyla Gang 2010
Rewired, DVD by The Electric Prunes 2003

Songs
 "Re-Wired" (song), song by Kasabian
"Rewired", song by The Electric Prunes from California (The Electric Prunes album)
"Rewired" by Paul Carrack Mike + the Mechanics from Rewired (album)

Other uses
 Rewire (company), Israeli banking and financial services company founded in 2015
 Rewire (website), a website focused on reproductive and sexual health
 ReWire software protocol, jointly developed by Propellerhead and Steinberg, allowing remote control and data transfer among digital audio editing
 Rewired (demoparty)

See also
Young Rewired State
Rewired State
Melt Zonk Rewire album by the New Klezmer Trio
Plughead Rewired: Circuitry Man II, 1994 American post apocalyptic science fiction film